021 is:

 in Brazil, the telephone area code for the city of Rio de Janeiro and surrounding cities (Greater Rio de Janeiro)
 in China, the telephone area code for the city of Shanghai.
 in Indonesia, the area code for the city of Jakarta and surrounding cities.
 in Iran, the telephone area code for the capital  city of Tehran.
 in Ireland, the area code for the city of Cork and a surrounding part of County Cork.
 in Libya, the telephone area code for the capital city of Tripoli.
 in Nepal, the Nepal Telecom telephone area code for the district of Morang.
 in New Zealand, the "area code" for cellular phones on the Vodafone network.
 in Pakistan, the telephone area code for the city of Karachi.
 in Serbia, the area code for the city of Novi Sad.
 see Telephone numbers in South Africa.
 in Sweden, the area code for the city of Västerås; see Telephone numbers in Sweden.
 in the United Kingdom, the former area code for Birmingham England (changed to 0121 on 16 April 1995).